Puzur-Sin was an Assyrian king in the 18th century BC, during the Old Assyrian period. One of the few known Assyrian rulers to be left out of the Assyrian King List, Puzur-Sin was responsible for ending the rule of the dynasty of Shamshi-Adad I, whom he considered to be foreign usurpers.

References 

Ancient Assyrians
18th-century BC Assyrian kings
Regents
18th-century BC people